Mordellistena doherty is a beetle in the genus Mordellistena of the family Mordellidae. It was described in 1917 by Maurice Pic.

References

doherty
Beetles described in 1917